Gießen is an electoral constituency (German: Wahlkreis) represented in the Bundestag. It elects one member via first-past-the-post voting. Under the current constituency numbering system, it is designated as constituency 173. It is located in central Hesse, comprising the Gießen district and the northwestern part of the Vogelsbergkreis district.

Gießen was created for the inaugural 1949 federal election. Since 2021, it has been represented by Felix Döring of the Social Democratic Party (SPD).

Geography
Gießen is located in central Hesse. As of the 2021 federal election, it comprises the entirety of the Gießen district excluding the municipalities of Biebertal and Wettenberg, as well as the municipalities of Alsfeld, Antrifttal, Feldatal, Gemünden (Felda), Homberg (Ohm), Kirtorf, Mücke, and Romrod from the Vogelsbergkreis district.

History
Gießen was created in 1949. In the 1949 election, it was Hesse constituency 8 in the numbering system. In the 1953 through 1976 elections, it was number 133. From 1980 through 1998, it was number 131. In 2002 and 2005, it was number 175. In the 2009 election, it was number 174. Since 2013, it has been number 173.

Originally, the constituency comprised the independent city of Gießen and the districts of Landkreis Gießen and Alsfeld. In the 1980 through 1998 elections, it comprised the entirety of Gießen district as well as the municipalities of Alsfeld, Antrifttal, Feldatal, Gemünden (Felda), Grebenau, Homberg (Ohm), Kirtorf, Mücke, Romrod, Schwalmtal from the Vogelbergskreis district. In the 2002 election, it acquired borders very similar to its current configuration, but including the municipalities of Grebenau, Schotten, and Schwalmtal from Vogelsbergkreis district. It acquired its current borders in the 2013 election.

Members
The constituency was first represented by Ludwig Schneider of the Free Democratic Party (FDP) from 1949 to 1957.  of the Social Democratic Party (SPD) was elected in 1957 and served until 1969. He was succeeded by fellow SPD member Erwin Horn.  of the Christian Democratic Union (CDU) was elected in 1983, but former member Horn regained the constituency in 1987 and served a further three terms. He was succeeded by fellow SPD member  in 1998, who served until 2009. Helge Braun of the CDU was elected in 2009, and re-elected in 2013 and 2017. Felix Döring regained the constituency for the SPD in 2021.

Election results

2021 election

2017 election

2013 election

2009 election

References

Federal electoral districts in Hesse
1949 establishments in West Germany
Constituencies established in 1949
Giessen (district)
Vogelsbergkreis